Dayi Pier-2 is a light rail station of the Circular Line of the Kaohsiung rapid transit system. It is located in Yancheng District, Kaohsiung, Taiwan.

Station overview
The station is a street-level station with two side platforms. It is located inside Pier-2 Art Center.

Station layout

Around the station
 Pier-2 Art Center
 Great Harbor Bridge
 Dayi Warehouse (大義倉庫)
 Holo Park
 Kaohsiung Harbor Piers 5-10

References

2015 establishments in Taiwan
Railway stations opened in 2015
Circular light rail stations